BG Pathum United Football Club is a Thai professional football club based in Pathum Thani province and is managed by BG Sports Company Limited which is a subsidiary of Bangkok Glass Public Company Limited. BG Pathum United FC participates in the Thai League 1.

The nickname of BGPU, "The Rabbits", derives from the chinese zodiac of the first club president, Pavin Bhirombhakdi who was born in The Year of the Rabbit.

History

Origins of the club: "Bangkok Glass" and early history
Bangkok Glass football Club started during the establishment of the Bangkok Glass Factory in 1979 which was a gathering to compete internally by employees. And later sent the team to participate in external competitions during the year 1989, which was a competition among industrial factories In Pathum Thani province Until became known to the general public.

In year 1999, employees and the management team had formed a substantial football club. And when the club was ready in various fields both the equipment and the stadium, Bangkok Glass Football Club was founded in April 2006 and opened for athletes the following month and becoming a member of Football Association of Thailand that year.

The first official competition of the club was to participate in Ngor Royal Football Cup 2007/2008, which the club achieved the goal as a second runner-up. In the final match, losing to Khukhot Municipal Football Club 1–0 and was eligible to be promoted to play in the King's Cup football in year later.

In 2008, the club established BGFC Sport Company Limited to manage the club and to be in accordance with AFC's guidelines and competed in Khor Royal Football Cup 2008/2009, able to reach the finals. In the finals, lost to JW Group Football Club 1–2 and promoted to play in the B(ข.) Cup. In addition, Bangkok Glass team had their own futsal team which competed in the Futsal Thailand League as well.

Takeover "Krung Thai Bank" and first year in the top flight

In January 2009, Krung Thai Bank Football Club, the club from Thailand Premier League announced the dissolution of the team due to not being able to comply with the conditions specified by AFC regarding registration as a juristic person. According to that Bangkok Glass Club from Football B(ข) Cup took over Krung Thai Bank Football Club which participated in Thai Premier League instead of the Krung Thai Bank Football Club that disbanded. They had to use temporary field by renting the Chalermphrakiat Khlong 6 stadium to renovate the Leo Stadium. In the first year of the competition, Bangkok Glass Football Club did a great job by finishing the second runner up in Thai Premier League 2009. As for the football team, which the employees and the management team have established in 1999, still participated in the competition under the name of Rangsit Football Club.

The club's growth
In 2010, Bangkok Glass Football Club was highly popular and Leo Stadium was completed after a major renovation, they returned to play on this field again after updating for almost 1 year. in January, Bangkok Glass Football Club sent the team to compete in the Queen's Cup and won the championship by defeating Police United 4–1. In that same year, they sent the team to compete in Singapore Cup, in the second year, they succeed by winning one more cup in Singapore Cup 2010.

The current manager is Supasin Leelarit and Surachai Jaturapattarapong was re-appointed as head coach at the end of the 2011 season. After a disappointing season Surachai stepped down again from his post October 2012 and was replaced by Phil Stubbins. The club finished the season a disappointing 8th in the 2012 season. After short lived in Bangkok Glass FC Phil Stubbins stepped down in March 2013, replaced by a young caretaker manager Anurak Srikerd. The team won two from six games.

The club announced its new head coach for midway of the 2013 Thai Premier League Attaphol Buspakom, one of Thailand’s most respected and successful coaches with an Asian Champions League runner-up in 2003 with BEC Tero Sasana and two Thai league titles with Muangthong United in 2009 and Buriram United in 2011. Attaphol completely changed a club football philosophy from a very direct long balls, style of play to more possession, more short passes. The team became runners-up in the Thai FA cup for the first time of club history, defeated by Buriram United 3–1 at Thammasat Stadium in the final and finishing fifth in the league. With Attaphol Buspakom, his time at the club ended when his team were defeated 1–2 by Port, in midway of the 2014 season, when he resigned and replace by Anurak Srikerd.

First successes under Coach Anurak

For short time assistant coach Anurak Srikerd taken over and he make the club history for the first club trophy Thai FA Cup 2014 since they founded.

Aurelio Vidmar became the eleventh permanent head coach of Bangkok Glass when his tenure was officially announced on 1 August 2016. The former Australia national under-23 head coach, who got The Rabbits played modern possession football philosophy and challenging for the top 3 spots for a short period in 2016 season, their best finish since 2009.

One year later, The Rabbits under Vidmar head coach handed Buriram United their only 2017 league defeat in 3 May.  The team managed to end their season by finishing fifth in the Thai League 1 with injuries at different times to key player of club – Thailand national team winger Sarawut Masuk, Costa Rica national team striker Ariel Rodriguez, Daniel Toti and the team's captain Matt Smith.

With Vidmar, his time at the club ended when his team won Navy 3–0, in the Thai League 2017 matchday 22. The team was giving a farewell party for Vidmar and took care of him feels like family.

Relegation, comeback and route to First Thai League 1 Title
In November 2017, Bangkok Glass appointed Josep Ferré as the club head coach.

In 2018, Bangkok Glass Club changed the symbol and the color of the new club and improved the Leo field Stadiums by using real grass. In March, The Rabbits were in danger of relegation,

In the last match of Thai League season 2018, the association announced that there would be 5 relegated teams. Bangkok Glass FC lost to Nakhon Ratchasima Mazda FC while the other two teams hoped to escape from the relegation, such as Sukhothai FC and Chainat Hornbill but they won. Resulting Chainat FC and Bangkok Glass FC had the same score of 42 points but Chainat FC had better stats making Bangkok Glass FC became the last team to be relegated by being ranked 14th caused to relegation to kick in Thai League 2 season later. It is the first time of the club has been in the past 10 years since the acquisition of Krung Thai Bank Club in 2009.

After relegation to Thai League 2 in 2018, the club changed the name to BG Pathum United to be one of the supporters of the club in Pathum Thani Province. The new club name will be launched in the 2019 season. In 2019, BG Pathum United FC won the Thai League 2 title, earning promotion back to the top tier. The season after, they took the lead of the Thai League on Day 7 and never looked back. Despite the league suspension due to Covid 19, the team maintained their form and didn't lose a game on their way to their first ever Thai League 1 title. Moreover, The Thai advanced playmaker Sumanya Purisai received most valuable player at the end of the year.

Academy development
Bangkok Glass Football Club has started football academy to select kids or teenagers who are interested in training football skills from the basic level to an advanced level in international programs by professional coaches. Training kids to have the knowledge of football correctly and making kids be true athletes. Even more, it can be adapted for the future to the professional level.

In 2009, Bangkok Glass opened its first youth academies, football clinic, every Saturday and Sunday. Under the direction of Hans Emser, the BGFC academy is recognized as one of the best in the country. They were prepared, trained, and selected youth players who have the potential to be a part of the first team of the club.

In 2012, Bangkok Glass signed a partnership agreement with Assumption College of Assumption Campus Rama 2 to be part of supporting football players and personnel of the school to have more knowledge in football and also developed young players who had the potential and ability to be a part of the Bangkok Glass players in the future.

In the same year, Bangkok Glass Football Club did support Siam Bangkok Glass (Rangsit F.C.) to compete in the Thai Royal Cup football match Khǒr Royal Cup until winning the Royal Cup and was promoted to play Regional football league, Bangkok and metropolitan area. The club has the policy to give the team Rangsit FC is the birth stage of the club youth footballers. It was creating opportunities, practicing, and learning to be a professional player before getting a chance to play in Bangkok Glass Football Club next.

In 2013, Bangkok Glass was a 2-year partnership with Thonburi University together to make a team Thonburi – BG United club, sent the team to compete in the regional football league, central and western zone, had Sathit Bensoh as the head coach and Bangkok Glass Club youth football players joined the team.

In 2015, The Rabbits joined AFC Champions League for the first time. After a successful decade, Bangkok Glass established Yamaoka Hanasaka Academy in collaboration with Cerezo Osaka and Yanmar for developing young footballers to become professional footballers. which is located at Klong 4 Rangsit, Pathum thani. Currently is welcoming youth to practice in the academy, U-12, U-15, and U-18.

Crest

Kits and sponsors

Title sponsors

Official sponsors
Here are the club's official sponsors for the 2019 season:

 Umay+
 Reparil
 Muangthai
 Mitsubishi Electric
 Novotel Accor
 Thai Smile
 Stiebel Eltron
 Go Muc
 Euro Cake

Kit evolution
First

Away

Stadium

BG Stadium, initially named LEO Stadium, is the official home ground of BG Pathum United Football Club, located on the perimeter of the Bangkok Glass Public Company Limited, Pathum Thani province. Since its grand opening in 2010, the iconic three-sided stadium has gone through multiple phases of evolution to reach its current 10,114 capacity and has been approved by FIFA and the AFC as an “A Class” level football ground.

The first-ever official football match to be held at the then-LEO Stadium was the 2009 Thai League game between Bangkok Glass FC (now renamed BG Pathum United) and the now-dissolved TOT Sports Club. The match was played in front of 925 supporters, all watching from the west side main stand, which was the only stadium stand at the time.

Due to the growing attendance, the club decided to move all home game fixtures in the latter stages of the 2009 Thai League to the Queen Sirikit 60th Anniversary Stadium, while LEO Stadium undergoes its first expansion construction. 

The club returned to the LEO Stadium at the beginning of the 2010 Thai League season. The stadium now expanded to hold 7,000 spectators and switched from real grass to artificial turf - a feature that will go on to become an iconic image of the ground. The first match to be played on the artificial turf version of LEO Stadium was held on the 24th of March 2010 and ended in a 1-1 draw between Bangkok Glass FC and Insee Police FC. Left-back Supachai Komsilp going down in history as the first player to score on the artificial turf. 

The 2011 flood forced Bangkok Glass FC to abandon their home ground once again. Luckily, after two months away, the Rabbits finally return to the LEO Stadium on the 22nd of October 2011. Amnaj Kaewkiew and Hironori Saruta are on the scoresheet as Bangkok Glass FC celebrates homecoming with a 2-0 victory over BEC Tero Sasana.

Stadium and locations

Affiliated clubs
 Cerezo Osaka (2012–present)
Bangkok Glass signed a partnership agreement with Cerezo Osaka of the J1 League in September 2012. There is the deal to work together at youth level.

Continental record

Season by season record

P = Played
W = Games won
D = Games drawn
L = Games lost
F = Goals for
A = Goals against
Pts = Points
Pos = Final position

TPL = Thai Premier League
TL = Thai League
T1 = Thai League 1

QR1 = First Qualifying Round
QR2 = Second Qualifying Round
QR3 = Third Qualifying Round
QR4 = Fourth Qualifying Round
RInt = Intermediate Round
R1 = Round 1
R2 = Round 2
R3 = Round 3

R4 = Round 4
R5 = Round 5
R6 = Round 6
GR = Group stage
QF = Quarter-finals
SF = Semi-finals
RU = Runners-up
S = Shared
W = Winners

Players

First team squad

Out on loan

Former players
For details on former players, see :Category:Bangkok Glass F.C. players.

Managerial history
Coaches by Years (2009–present)

Honours

Domestic competitions

Leagues
 Thai League 1 
Winner (1): 2020–21
Thai League 2:
Winner (1): 2019

Cups
 FA Cup: 
 Champions (1): 2014
 Thailand Champions Cup: 
 Champions (2): 2021, 2022

Other
 Thai Super Cup: 
 Champions (1): 2009
 Queen's Cup: 
 Champions (1): 2010
 Singapore Cup: 
 Champions (1): 2010

References

External links

 Official Website 
 Bangkok Glass at Thai Premier League

 
Football clubs in Thailand
Association football clubs established in 2006
Thai League 1 clubs
Thai FA Cup winners
Sport in Pathum Thani province
2006 establishments in Thailand